Razi Metro Station is a station on Shiraz Metro Line 1 along Modares Boulevard. Provincial central post office is the most notable landmark nearby.

References

Shiraz Metro stations
Railway stations opened in 2017